Thomas Drummond Ritter (born November 24, 1952) is an American lawyer, lobbyist, and retired politician from Connecticut who was the Speaker of the Connecticut House of Representatives from 1993-1998.

Early life and education 
Ritter attended Amherst College and later the University of Connecticut School of Law.

Family 
Ritter’s wife Christine E. Keller is an appellate court judge. Both his father and his brother are former lawmakers. His son Matthew Ritter is also a lawyer and State Representative as well as the current Majority Leader of the Connecticut House of Representatives.

Political career 
Ritter served on the Hartford Democratic Town Committee from 1975 to 1980 and was a member of the Connecticut House of Representatives from 1980 to 1998. He was speaker from 1993-1998.

Ritter and Moira K. Lyons are the only three term Speakers in history of the Connecticut House of Representatives.

Ritter sits on the UCONN board of directors. In 2019 he became the acting chair of the board when chairman Kruger stepped down. Kruger has named West Hartford Mayor Shari Cantor as his preferred permanent successor over Ritter, writing that "it’s time for the University board to be led by a woman.” Some have cited emoluments as a potential risk of his chairmanship.

Legal career 
Ritter is currently a partner at the law firm of Brown Rudnick. Prior to joining the firm, he worked as an attorney for the Hartford Corporation Counsel and was in private practice for many years. Freedom of information act requests for communications between Ritter and his client the Connecticut Resources Recovery Authority where at the center of a Connecticut Supreme Court case in 2016.

References 

|-

|-

1952 births
People from New Haven, Connecticut
Connecticut lawyers
Lawyers from Hartford, Connecticut
Living people
Democratic Party members of the Connecticut House of Representatives
Politicians from Hartford, Connecticut
University of Connecticut School of Law alumni
Amherst College alumni
Loomis Chaffee School alumni